Uchōten (有頂天 ecstasy) is a Japanese experimental new wave/post punk band, active in the 1980s and early 1990s. They formed in 1982 and disbanded in 1991, after releasing eight studio albums and two live albums. In 2015, after over two decades apart, Uchoten surprisingly reunited.

History

Uchoten formed in Tokyo, Japan from the ruins of a band called Densenbyou. Densenbyou's last concert was 6 April 1982 and Uchoten's first concert the same day.
They are led by vocalist Keralino Sandorovich, called Kera.

Uchoten released their first album and singles on Kera's own independent record label, Nagomu. In 1985, they released Kokoro no tabi on a bigger indie label, Captain. It is a cover of a popular Japanese song from 1973, performed by Tulip. In those days, Uchoten, The Willard and Laughin' Nose were called the Indies Big Three.

In September 1986 they released their major debut album, Peace.
Peace has a theme of ending and death, and some worried that Uchoten were going to break up. But they lasted five more years, although with several member changes.

Uchoten initially played their last concert 15 September 1991, a recording of which was later released on CD, Search For 1/3 Fin, until reuniting in 2015 after 24 years apart.

Throughout their career, Uchoten did a number of covers, of artists including King Crimson, Gilbert O'Sullivan, Lizard, P-Model and Takuro Yoshida.

Lineups
April 1982 - September 1982
Kera - Vocals
Toshi - Guitar
Tabo - Guitar
Chachamaru - Bass
Mika - Bass
Eriko - Keyboard
Zin - Percussion
Minosuke - Drums
September 1982 - May 1984
Kera - Vocals
Toshi - Guitar
Tabo - Guitar
Chachamaru - Bass
Eriko - Keyboard
Zin - Drums
July 1984 - May 1985
Kera - Vocals
Toshi - Guitar
Tabo - Guitar
Kubobryu - Bass
Eriko - Keyboards
Zin - Drums
June 1985 - February 1986
Kera - Vocals
Huckai - Guitar
Cou - Guitar
Kubobryu - Bass
Charity - Keyboard
Zin - Drums
February 1986 - February 1988
Kera - Vocals
Huckai - Guitar
Cou - Guitar
Kubobryu - Bass
Myue - Keyboard
Zin - Drums
March 1988 - May 1989
Kera - Vocals
Huckai - Guitar
Cou - Guitar
Kubobryu - Bass
Shiu - Keyboard
Zin - Drums
May 1989 - September 1991
Kera - Vocals
Cou - Guitar
Kubobryu - Bass
Shiu - Keyboard
Zin - Drums

Discography

Dohyou ouji (1983)
Because (1986)
Peace (1986)
Aissle (1987)
Search For 1/3 Boil (1988) Live album
Gan (1988)
Search For 1/3 Stop! Hand In Hand (1989)
Colorful Merry ga futta machi (1990)
Dekkachi (1990)
Search For 1/3 Fin (1991) Live album
1984-1987 Vegetable (1992) Best-of
Lost and Found (2015)
Kafka's Rock/Nietzsche's Pop (2016)

External links
 Japanese fansite

Uchoten
Musical groups from Tokyo
Musical groups established in 1982
Musical groups disestablished in 1991
1982 establishments in Japan
1991 disestablishments in Japan